The Kentuckian is a 1955 American CinemaScope Western film directed by Burt Lancaster, who also starred. This was one of only two films Lancaster directed (the other was The Midnight Man), and the only one for which he has sole credit. It was Walter Matthau's film debut. The film is an adaptation of the novel The Gabriel Horn by Felix Holt. The film was shot in locations around Kentucky, including Cumberland Falls, the Levi Jackson Wilderness Road State Park near London, Owensboro, and Green River, and at the Abraham Lincoln Memorial Village near Rockport, Indiana. A feature landmark is the natural arch Sky Bridge .

Plot
Frontiersman Elias "Big Eli" Wakefield (Lancaster) decides to leave 1820s Kentucky and move to Texas with his son "Little Eli" (Donald MacDonald). Along the way, they run into two women who take a liking to the pair, indentured servant Hannah (Dianne Foster), who wants to go with them, and schoolteacher Susie (Diana Lynn), who would rather have Big Eli marry her and settle down. Big Eli has to deal with villainous Stan Bodine (Matthau), who cracks a bullwhip. The film features an appearance by the famed sternwheel riverboat Gordon C. Greene, the same steamboat used in Gone with the Wind and Steamboat Round the Bend.

Cast

Production
Near the end of the film,  a ferocious fight occurs between Lancaster's character and Matthau's whip-wielding villain. Matthau was doubled by whip expert Whip Wilson, who cut Lancaster across the shoulder after the star asked him to "hit me and make it look real". Lancaster had also taken a real whipping during the filming of Norma Productions' first film Kiss the Blood Off My Hands in 1948.

Release
As part of the publicity, the producer, Hecht and Lancaster, commissioned Thomas Hart Benton to create the painting The Kentuckian, which depicts a scene from the film. The painting belonged to the Hecht family for years but was ultimately donated to the Los Angeles County Museum of Art in 1978.

References

External links
 
 
 
 

1950s historical adventure films
1955 Western (genre) films
1955 directorial debut films
1955 films
CinemaScope films
American historical adventure films
American Western (genre) films
Films based on American novels
Films directed by Burt Lancaster
Films produced by Burt Lancaster
Films produced by James Hill
Films produced by Harold Hecht
Films scored by Bernard Herrmann
Films set in Kentucky
Films set in Texas
Films set in the 1820s
Films shot in Kentucky
Norma Productions films
United Artists films
Revisionist Western (genre) films
1950s English-language films
1950s American films